The Raven Cycle is a series of four contemporary fantasy novels written by American author Maggie Stiefvater. The first novel, The Raven Boys, was published by Scholastic in 2012, and the final book, The Raven King, was published on 26 April 2016.

Plot

The Raven Boys
The Raven Cycle follows the story of teenagers Blue Sargent, Richard Gansey III, Adam Parrish, Ronan Lynch, and Noah, taking place in the fictional town of Henrietta, Virginia. Blue lives with her mother, Maura, and assorted other female relatives, all of whom are psychic except her, and they have predicted that if she kisses her true love, he will die. Her only power is that she makes the psychic's powers stronger. Blue joins her half-aunt, Neeve, who has arrived in Henrietta under mysterious circumstances, in an annual tradition of watching the spirits of those in Henrietta destined to die in the next year appear along an invisible line called the Corpse Road. Blue, having never been able to see the spirits before, sees a teenage boy who introduces himself only as “Gansey.” Neeve tells Blue she could see him either because he is her true love, or she will kill him.

Richard Gansey III, Adam, Ronan, and Noah are so-called “Raven Boys” who attend the prestigious private school Aglionby Academy in Henrietta. Blue dislikes and is determined to stay away from Raven Boys, thinking them pretentious and self-absorbed. Realizing that Gansey is the spirit she saw on the corpse road, Blue vows she will never fall in love with him. She nevertheless befriends the group, showing an interest in Adam, a Henrietta boy at Aglionby on scholarship who lives with his abusive parents in a trailer park. Ronan lives with Gansey in a former factory called Monmouth Manufacturing, unable to return to his childhood home after his father was murdered and his mother fell into a coma. Noah also resides at Monmouth Manufacturing, and occasionally offhandedly remarks about how he is dead. Blue joins the boys as they attempt to find the Welsh king Owain Glendower, who is thought to be buried on the Corpse Road, also called the ley line, of Henrietta, Virginia. Gansey is determined to find Glendower, believing he saved his life seven years prior, and believes that the king is not dead, merely sleeping, and will grant a favor to those that wake him. In their search, the group discovers a mysterious forest along the ley line called Cabeswater that seems to exist out of time and speaks to them in Latin. They also begin to suspect that their search is being watched. The Aglionby Latin teacher, Barrington Whelk, remembers his days as an Aglionby student with his friend Czerny, and their exploration of the ley line, leading to Czerny’s death seven years prior in a ritual murder. Out exploring on their own, Gansey and Blue discover a human skeleton, with a wallet containing a driver’s license belonging to a Noah Czerny. Confronting Noah at Monmouth, they realize the boy has been a ghost as long as they’ve known him.  As the investigation into Noah’s remains begins, Whelk becomes increasingly unhinged, realizing the police will connect him to Noah’s murder. He decides to perform a ritual on the ley line again in a last-ditch effort to control its power. He threatens Gansey with a gun and nearly shoots him in order to get information from Gansey’s journal on the ley lines. Blue learns that Neeve had come to Henrietta to help Maura with a mysterious task, but had also been contacted by Whelk, though she refused to help him. Meanwhile, Adam’s father, convinced that Adam has not turned over enough of his income from his three jobs to him, beats Adam severely to the point that he loses hearing in his left ear. Ronan intervenes and fights Adam’s father, and Adam prevents Ronan from being arrested by reporting the abuse from his father and pressing charges. The group of teens and the psychics try to determine how to prevent Whelk from taking control of the ley line, fearing they are running out of time. Neeve kidnaps Whelk, intending to use him in the ley line ritual, but is overpowered and nearly sacrificed to the line herself until she mysteriously disappears. Adam gives the line a sacrifice of his free will to become the hands and eyes of Cabeswater, and a stampede of mysterious creatures kills Whelk. The teens try to move forward with their search for Glendower and the mysteries of Cabeswater and the ley line, and Ronan reveals that he can take things out of his dreams.

The Dream Thieves
The second book in the series, The Dream Thieves, focuses on Ronan's ability to take things from his dreams. The book begins by revealing Ronan has three secrets. A hit-man called the Gray Man, who killed Ronan's father, comes to Henrietta under the orders of a man named Colin Greenmantle looking for something called the Greywaren, which he believes is an object that allows the user to take things out of their dreams. It's revealed that the Greywaren is not an object, but a name for Ronan. Cabeswater vanishes, and another teenage boy called Joseph Kavinsky reveals that he can take things out of his dreams as well. Kavinsky abuses the ability to steal from his dreams, and with both boys taking things out of their dreams, they stress the energy of Cabeswater and the ley line. Blue's mother Maura and the Gray Man fall for each other, but the Gray Man runs from Henrietta claiming he stole the Greywaren so that Ronan will be safe from Greenmantle. Adam restores energy to the ley line with the help of Persephone, a psychic at 300 Fox Way. They bring back Cabeswater, and Ronan uses one of his night terrors to fight Kavinsky and his fire dragon. Eventually Kavinsky's life is ended by his own dragon. With his father's will stating that he cannot visit the home he grew up in, Ronan dreams up a new will so he can return to his sleeping mother. Ronan's three secrets are revealed. Blue reads a note saying that her mother is underground, setting up the next book.

Blue Lily, Lily Blue
In the third book of the series, Blue Lily, Lily Blue, Blue's mother Maura leaves to look for Artemus, Blue's birth father, in a cave. Persephone continues to help Adam learn how to fix the ley lines the way Cabeswater has asked. Calla, another psychic, tries to contact Maura with her abilities. She tells Blue and the boys of three sleepers in the caves and warns them not to wake the third sleeper. Colin Greenmantle becomes the Latin teacher at Aglionby, and Adam and Ronan plan to drive him out of Henrietta. Blue and Gansey find another cave in the backyard of a man named Jesse Dittley, who was one of the spirits Neeve saw in the graveyard and in the cave, they find a woman named Gwenllian, who is Glendower's daughter. Persephone dies in an attempt to find Maura, and Adam and Ronan blackmail Greenmantle into leaving. Greenmantle's wife Piper hires thugs and goes to Jesse Dittley's cave where she kills Dittley, captures the Gray Man, and enters the cave. The teens and Gwenllian go to the Cabeswater cave where they find animal skeletons that they collectively wake up. Blue and Ronan find a magic lake where after crossing the lake, Blue finds Maura and Artemus. Blue, Artemus, Maura, and the Gray Man escape, leaving Piper and the thug in the collapsed cave, where Neeve finds Piper who wakes up the third sleeper.

The Raven King
The fourth and final installation of The Raven Cycle is entitled The Raven King. Gansey, Adam, Ronan, Noah, and Blue continue their quest to find the Welsh King Glendower.
While Piper wakes up the third sleeper, a demon with the power to "unmake", the boys and Blue race to save Cabeswater.

Short Stories
Short Stories in the Raven Cycle universe include "Opal", "A Very Declan Christmas", and two short drabbles taking place around the holidays, one about Gansey and one about 300 Fox Way.

Setting
Much of the story takes place in  the fictional town of Henrietta, Virginia, which sits directly on top of a powerful ley line. Adam, Ronan, Blue, Noah, and Gansey repeatedly return to the mysterious Cabeswater, a forest that exists out of its own time and that talks to the group in Latin. Adam, Ronan, and Gansey all attend school at Aglionby Academy, an all-boys private school that is very expensive. Ronan's childhood home is called The Barns, and it's where he discovers his mother is one of his father's dream creations. 300 Fox Way is the home of Blue and the multitude of psychic women in Henrietta. Monmouth Manufacturing is the abandoned and gutted warehouse, owned by Gansey, in which he, Ronan, and Noah reside, as well as the place where Malory and his service dog stay during their visit. Some of the story takes place in the caves that are underneath Cabeswater where Glendower is supposedly sleeping.

Major characters

Blue Sargent 
Blue Sargent is the daughter of a psychic named Maura, and lives with her and other psychic women at their home, 300 Fox Way. Despite not having psychic abilities of her own, Blue is able to amplify the energy of other psychics and supernatural beings. She works at a restaurant called Nino's and desperately wants to travel the world and help others. The psychic women that live with her have told her that if she ever kisses her true love, he will die.

Maura Sargent 
Maura is the psychic mother of Blue and she typically uses Tarot cards to make her readings. She usually wears her trademark tattered jeans, and has a penchant for going barefoot. She falls in love with the Gray Man, and later disappears underground, supposedly in search of Artemus, Blue's biological father. She does important tarot readings with her two best friends, Persephone and Calla.

Richard Campbell Gansey III 
Called Gansey by his friends, Richard Campbell Gansey III is a student at Aglionby Academy who has been on a journey to find the sleeping Welsh king Glendower that he believes saved his life seven years prior. Gansey's allergy to bee stings caused him to die seven years ago from a hornet sting, but he was saved by Glendower. This experience left him anxious and prone to panic attacks. He is the son of a wealthy businessman and politician. Gansey drives an orange Camaro called the Pig.

Adam Parrish 
Adam Parrish is a student at Aglionby Academy who struggles financially, but doesn't want financial assistance or pity from his friends. At the beginning of the story, he lived with his mother and his abusive father in a trailer, but later he stands up for himself by pressing charges against his father and moves into an apartment above St. Agnes church. He sacrificed his free will to Cabeswater, promising to fix the ley lines and help restore Cabeswater. As of "The Raven King", he is in a relationship with Ronan Lynch. Adam is deaf in his left ear due to a violent incident with his father. He worked as a mechanic and later was taught how to harness Cabeswater's energy by Persephone before her death. He gets a car of his own that is old, beat-up, and made of parts from different makes and models of cars. Ronan refers to it as the "Hondayota".

Ronan Lynch 
Ronan Lynch is described as "dangerous as a shark and about as friendly." Cabeswater calls him the Greywaren. Ronan also possesses the ability to take things out of his dreams. Ronan uses this ability to try and help wake up his mother and the livestock from his childhood home, all of which are things that Niall Lynch took out of his own dreams. He helps Adam create fake evidence against Greenmantle in order to blackmail him into leaving Henrietta. As of "The Raven King", he is in a relationship with Adam Parrish. Ronan is the central character in a companion series called The Dreamer Trilogy, which takes places after the events of The Raven King and Opal. He has two brothers: Declan and Matthew, who both attend Aglionby. Declan is his charismatic older brother, and Matthew is his good-humored littler brother, who Ronan took out of his dreams when he was a child. His favorite past times include defenestrating his close friend Noah Czerny and (in book 2) racing with Kavinsky.

Noah Czerny 
Noah Czerny was a skater boy and student at Aglionby who has been dead for seven years at the time of the series. He was murdered by Barrington Whelk, his friend and classmate, when Whelk attempted, and failed, to sacrifice him to wake the ley lines. He relies on energy of the ley lines or Blue Sargent in order to stay substantial. Over the course of the series, it is revealed that his spirit is decaying and he needs more energy in order to look normal. He often is caught re-enacting his death at points in the story. On his final appearance he sacrifices the memories his friends have of him in order to save Gansey's life.

Colin Greenmantle 
Colin Greenmantle is a collecter of mysterious artifacts and the employer of the Gray Man. He sent the Gray Man to kill Ronan Lynch's father and then sends the Gray Man to find the Greywaren. He comes to Henrietta under the guise of Aglionby's new Latin teacher so that he can find the Greywaren himself after the Gray Man betrays him. He leaves Henrietta and returns to Boston, leaving his wife Piper alone in Jesse Dittley's cave. He is later killed by Piper using the demon against him.

The Gray Man (Mr. Gray) 
The Gray Man is a hit-man hired by Greenmantle initially to steal something called the Greywaren. While in Henrietta, he takes a liking to the town and falls in love with Blue's mother Maura, who likes him back. He leaves Henrietta to protect Ronan, but returns when he discovers that Greenmantle came back. He enjoys Anglo-Saxon poetry and recites poems from memory occasionally throughout the story. He listens to the 60s band the Kinks religiously, and is regarded as a calm, practical, capable man.

Glendower
Glendower is the Welsh king that allegedly saved Gansey's life seven years before the story takes place. Throughout the story, the characters talk about and refer Glendower, even though they do not directly interact with him. If the teenagers find Glendower and wake him up, they believe he will grant them a favor. It is later revealed in The Raven King, that Gansey did not hear Glendower's voice when he died, but Noah's.

Other characters

The Psychics
At 300 Fox Way, a multitude of psychics come into play, including Orla, Neeve, Persephone, Calla, and Jimi. These women all use their abilities to help the group of teenagers find their way to Glendower, as well as using their abilities to make a living.

Neeve
Neeve is Maura's half-sister. She is a commercial psychic and TV show host. She is morally ambiguous and it is never quite clear whose side she's on.

Persephone
Persephone is Maura and Calla's best friend and lives at 300 Fox Way. She is good at seeing vague details and tends to be a bit disconnected from the physical world around her. In Blue Lily Lily Blue, she begins tutoring Adam and teaching him how to use his newfound powers. She often acts as the middle ground between Calla and Maura. She is overall an otherworldly person.

Calla
Calla is Maura and Persephone's best friend. She is the bluntest and most standoffish of the psychics with a penchant for purple lipsticks. Calla has a specific psychic power- when touching an object, she can divine details about its owner and their memories. Calla is prickly and shows a general disdain for those around her, but is a good person

Orla
Orla is Jimi's daughter and Maura Sargent's niece. She is beautiful and knows it and has a knowledge of almost all town gossip. She has an endless string of ex-lovers and is self-confident and social.

Jimi
Jimi is Orla's mother and Blue's aunt. Her psychic specialty is in spiritual harmony and cleansing bad energy. She is peaceful and easygoing, but a very minor character.

Artemus
One of Glendower's followers and Blue's biological father. Blue had never met him until she found and rescued him from the cave underneath Cabeswater. At 300 Fox Way, he shuts himself in a closet because he is terrified of Gwenllian.

Gwenllian
Gwenllian is the daughter of Glendower and is discovered face down in a stone coffin in Jesse Dittley's cave. She continuously speaks in riddles and sings randomly. She and Blue are alike in that they don't have normal psychic abilities but rather they mirror others' abilities.

Henry Cheng
An Aglionby student of Korean and Chinese descent who is friends with Gansey and later befriends Blue, while Adam and Ronan don't seem fond of him. Throughout The Raven King, his bond with Gansey and Blue is strengthened and he's present in various important passages. By the end of the series Henry, Gansey and Blue are out for an (at least) year-long journey.

Joseph Kavinsky
Referred to as "Kavinsky" and "K", he has the same ability as Ronan to pull things out of his dreams. He uses this ability to steal from his dreams, whereas Ronan asks for things. Kavinsky likes to race Ronan and has a field full of replicas of the same car. He has an fixation on Ronan and Gansey's relationship, often making gay jokes about them. He uses his dreaming ability for his own selfish purposes and eventually dies because of a fire dragon he took from a dream.

Jesse Dittley
A minor character, Jesse Dittley's name is on the list of people that Neeve saw at the beginning of the story in the graveyard indicating his death within twelve months. Later, Blue and Gansey meet him and convince him to let them explore his cave, even though Dittley tells them that his family is cursed by it. In the cave, they find Gwenllian, and later Dittley reveals that strange creatures have been coming out of the cave, sometimes coming into the house. Piper Greenmantle kills him in order to enter the cave.

Piper Greenmantle
The wife of Colin Greenmantle, she first appears in Blue Lily, Lily Blue as a woman who simply wants to be entertained. When Colin moves her to Henrietta, she takes up an interest in psychics and Tarot cards, and eventually she decides to go out and get what they came to Henrietta for. She hires two thugs herself and kills Jesse Dittley, entering his cave. After a cave-in, she wakes up and enters a room where a mysterious, non-human creature is in a tomb and she tells it to wake up. This is later revealed to be a demon. Piper later attempts to sell the demon, and is unsuccessful when she is shot by her father.

Adaptations
On April 10, 2017, it was announced that a TV adaptation of the series is in production, with Catherine Hardwicke attached to direct and produce, and Andrew Miller as its showrunner and will be distributed by Warner Bros. Domestic Television. In November 2019, Stiefvater confirmed she had written a pilot. In spring of 2020 Stiefvater confirmed production had stopped.

On October 17, 2022, Maggie Steifvater announced via Twitter that the novels will be adapted to a series of graphic novels, the first volume to be released in spring 2025. It will be adapted into the format by Stephanie Williams and Sas Milledge.

References

Book series introduced in 2012
Young adult novel series
Fantasy novel series
Paranormal romance novel series
Books about birds